The Punkva Caves (Czech: Punkevní jeskyně) are a cave system of the Czech Republic located north of the city of Brno, near the town of Blansko. The Punkva River flows through it. Part of it is the Macocha Gorge, its sinkhole is about 138.7 meters deep and also the deepest of its kind (light hole type) in Central Europe. 
It is a popular tourist attraction for casual visitors to the region, in addition to cavers and advanced technical divers.

Gallery

See also
 Karst

References

External links
Punkva Caves Official Website 

Blansko District
Geography of the South Moravian Region
Tourist attractions in the South Moravian Region
Show caves in the Czech Republic
Caves of the Czech Republic
Ramsar sites in the Czech Republic